Akadémiai Kiadó is the publishing house of the Hungarian Academy of Sciences. It is one of Hungary's most important publishers of scientific books and journals. Its majority-owner is the Amsterdam-based publishing conglomerate Wolters Kluwer, while the Hungarian Academy of Sciences holds a minority share.
It was founded in 1828 and is based in Budapest. It publishes monographs and journals. The branch that publishes journals is AKJournals.

Encyclopedias 
 Biology Encyclopedia (1975–1987)
  (1989–1990)
 Academic Encyclopedia Series (2007–)—Volumes:
 Environment (2007)
 Psychology (2008)

 World Religions (2009)

Journals

References

External links 
 Home page
 AKJournals 
 REAL-J —digitized journals at the Hungarian Academy of Sciences
 

Companies based in Budapest
Publishing companies of Hungary
Publishing companies established in 1828
Hungarian Academy of Sciences